HD 106252 is a star with a brown dwarf companion in the constellation Virgo. An apparent visual magnitude of 7.41 means this star is too faint to be visible to the naked eye. It is located at a distance of 210 light years from the Sun based on parallax measurements, and is receding with a radial velocity of 15 km/s.

The stellar classification of HD 106252 is G0V, matching an ordinary G-type main-sequence star. It has 5% more mass than the Sun and 10% greater in girth. This star is about three billion years old with a low level of magnetic activity and is spinning with a projected rotational velocity of 2 km/s. It is radiating 1.3 times the luminosity of the Sun from its photosphere at an effective temperature of 5,890 K.

In 2001, a massive sub-stellar companion was announced orbiting the star by the European Southern Observatory. The discovery was confirmed by a different team using the Lick Telescope.

References

External links

G-type main-sequence stars
Planetary systems with one confirmed planet
Virgo (constellation)
Durchmusterung objects
106252
059610